Collagen triple helix repeat containing 1 is a protein that in humans is encoded by the CTHRC1 gene.

Function

This locus encodes a protein that may play a role in the cellular response to arterial injury through involvement in vascular remodeling. Mutations at this locus have been associated with Barrett's esophagus and esophageal adenocarcinoma. Alternatively, spliced transcript variants have been described.

References

Further reading